The Amateur Radio Society of India (ARSI) is a national non-profit organization for amateur radio enthusiasts in India.  ARSI is recognized by the Indian government under the provisions of Section 13 of the Indian Societies Registration Act (No. XXI of 1860) as amended and extended.  ARSI operates a QSL bureau for those amateur radio operators in regular contact with amateur radio operators in other countries, and supports amateur radio operating awards and radio contests.  The Amateur Radio Society of India represents the interests of Indian amateur radio operators before national and international regulatory authorities.  ARSI is the national member society representing India in the International Amateur Radio Union.

Expeditions 
The Amateur Radio Society of India has been instrumental in leading amateur radio DX-peditions to the remote island territories of India in the Indian Ocean. ARSI organised an amateur radio DX-pedition to Lakshadweep in December, 2006 with the callsign VU7LD. A second ARSI expedition was carried out from Andaman in 2011 operating from Port Blair with the callsign VU4PB. Many ARSI members have also operated from  smaller islands in the Arabian Sea and Bay of Bengal as part of the Radio Society of Great Britain's Islands On The Air IOTA programme.

References

External links 
Bangalore Amateur Radio Society
Mumbai Amateur Radio Institute

 HAM RADIO CallSign Directory of India qrz.vu2ukr.com 
Tamilnadu Amateur Radio Society

India
Amateur radio in India
Amateur radio organisations in India
Organizations established in 1954
Organisations based in Bangalore
1954 establishments in India